Aaron Schaffhausen is a man who murdered his three daughters in their house in River Falls, Wisconsin in 2012.

Background
Aaron and Jessica Schaffhausen married in 2000 and both filed for divorce in 2011; the divorce was finalized in January of the next year. Jessica Schaffhausen, who had primary physical custody, lived with their daughters, Amara, Sophie, and Cecilia in a house in River Falls that they rented from Aaron Schaffhausen, while he lived in Minot, North Dakota. The two parties had joint custody. Amara and Sophie attended Greenwood Elementary School.

Crime
On July 10, 2012, Schaffhausen sent a text message to his ex-wife requesting a visit to their daughters. His ex-wife was not present at the house, and the babysitter left after Schaffhausen arrived. He slit the throats of the three girls. He also strangled Cecilia. Amara, Sophie, and Cecilia were 11, 8, and 5. Schaffhausen later called his ex-wife to tell her that he had killed them. A can of gasoline was spilled onto the ground.

Schaffhausen turned himself in at a police station in River Falls. He was charged with three murders and attempted arson. His bond was set to $2 million.

Trial and punishment
On March 29, 2013 Schaffhausen entered a "guilty but insane" plea. Prosecutors accused him of killing the girls to get revenge against his ex-wife. Schaffhausen stated that this was his motive, but that he did not know right from wrong due to a mental issue. He also pleaded guilty to attempted arson. According to prosecutors, Schaffhausen disliked that his ex-wife was romantically involved with someone else, and he had resentment over the divorce.

In April 2013 a jury ruled that Schaffhausen was sane when he committed the murders. Jurors took three and a half hours to conclude that Schaffhausen knew right from wrong despite his mental issues. Howard Cameron, the St. Croix County judge, gave him three life sentences without parole, one for each victim. In 2014 Cameron also made Schaffhausen pay over $14,000 in restitution to Jessica Schaffhausen; about one-fourth of the money given by his family and any money he earns while in prison will be garnished and given to his ex-wife. In addition he was asked to pay witness costs of $10,000. In 2015 one of Schaffhausen's appeals was denied.

Schaffhausen was housed in the St. Croix County Jail during his trial. He entered the Wisconsin Department of Corrections in July 2013, and is incarcerated at Waupun Correctional Institution.

Aftermath
The funeral for the girls was held at the Kilkarney Hills Golf Club in River Falls on Tuesday, July 17, 2012.

Affinity Plus Federal Credit Union acquired the house where the murders took place. Details Construction dismantled the house; its materials were donated to St. Croix Habitat for Humanity. The credit union used the money generated from the sale of the land to fund a park built in honor of the girls. The Tri-Angels Playground at Hoffman Park, accessible to handicapped children and built with designs referring to each of the three girls, opened in 2015.

Jessica Schaffhausen remarried and had children with her new husband.

See also 
 List of homicides in Wisconsin
Cases of filicide attributed to revenge against an ex-spouse:
 John Battaglia
 Elaine Campione
 Amy Hebert
 Murder of the Kumari-Baker sisters
 Charles Mihayo

References

External links
 Articles about Aaron Schaffhausen from WCCO CBS 6
 Articles about Aaron Schaffhausen from Fox 6
 Hoffman Park (site of Tri-Angels Playground) - City of River Falls

2012 murders in the United States
American murderers of children
American people convicted of murder
Crimes in Wisconsin
Criminals from North Dakota
Filicides in the United States
Incidents of violence against girls
Living people
People convicted of murder by Wisconsin
People from River Falls, Wisconsin
Place of birth missing (living people)
Prisoners sentenced to life imprisonment by Wisconsin
St. Croix County, Wisconsin
Year of birth missing (living people)